Toužim is a town in Karlovy Vary District in the Karlovy Vary Region of the Czech Republic. It has about 3,600 inhabitants. The historic town centre is well preserved and is protected by law as urban monument zone.

Administrative parts
Villages of Bezděkov, Branišov, Dobrá Voda, Dřevohryzy, Kojšovice, Komárov, Kosmová, Lachovice, Luhov, Nežichov, Políkno, Prachomety, Radyně, Smilov and Třebouň are administrative parts of Toužim.

Geography
It lies on the Střela river, in the Teplá Highlands.

History

The first written mention of Toužim is in a document from 1354, where there was written about the site of a Premonstratensian provostry. The surrounding fortified town was founded in 1469.

Sights
The landmark of the historical centre is the castle complex, formed by two castle buildings, a manorial brewery, and fragments of town walls.

The parish deanery Church of the Nativity of the Virgin Mary was built after 1488. The original late Gothic church building was damaged by fires and rebuilt in 1738–1742. The northern Gothic tower and the Baroque side chapel of Christ the Sufferer from 1699 have been preserved.

The former town hall on the town square is a Neoclassical-Empire building with Gothic core. It was rebuilt to its present form after numerous fires. In the middle of the town square is a Marian column from 1705, a fountain from the mid-18th century, and a modern sculpture of George of Poděbrady, after whom the square is named.

Notable people
Francis Erdmann, Duke of Saxe-Lauenburg (1629–1666), German nobleman
Josef Antonín Sehling (1710–1756), composer
Ignaz Friedrich Tausch (1793–1848), botanist

References

External links

Toužim Castle

Cities and towns in the Czech Republic
Populated places in Karlovy Vary District